The Aldo Rovira Trophy (Premio Aldo Rovira) is a trophy awarded by Futbol Club Barcelona to its best player of the season and it is decided by a jury composed of board of directors and heads of sport in Catalan media. The award was created in 2010 in memory of the son of former FC Barcelona director, Josep Lluis Rovira, who died in a car/traffic accident one year earlier.

Lionel Messi won the inaugural prize for the season held in 2009–10 and he has also won the award on a record six occasions.

Key
  denotes a player registered with Barcelona in the 2022–23 season
 Player (X) denotes the number of times a player has won the award

Winners

Statistics

Wins by playing position

Wins by nationality

Women's Trofeo Aldo Rovira

See also 
 Joan Gamper Trophy
 Trofeo Alfredo Di Stéfano 
 Don Balón
 Trofeo EFE
 LFP Awards

References

External links 
 Club home page

Spanish football trophies and awards
FC Barcelona
Awards established in 2010